Cingolo (also known as Quingolo) was one of the traditional independent Ovimbundu kingdoms in Angola.

In 1774-6, Cingolo fought a war against the Portuguese alongside Bailundu.

See also

 Citata
 Civula
 Ciyaka
 Ekekete
 Kakonda
 Kalukembe
 Kingdom of Ndulu
 Ngalangi
 Viye

References

Ovimbundu kingdoms